Aveda Corporation is an American cosmetics company founded by Horst Rechelbacher, now owned by Estée Lauder Companies, and headquartered in Minneapolis, Minnesota. Aveda manufactures skin and body care, cosmetics, perfume (internally called "pure-fume"), hair color, and hair care products, and trains students in cosmetology, massage, and esthiology at the Aveda Institutes in Minneapolis, New York City, Des Moines, Washington, D.C., Maryland, Vancouver, Calgary, Orlando, Denver, Toronto, and many other cities.

History

Aveda was founded by Horst Rechelbacher in 1978.
In 1970, Horst, on a trip to India, was introduced to the science of Ayurveda (the Hindu traditional holistic system of medicine and surgery from India), and suddenly his vision for his company was born. Horst formulated the first product, a clove shampoo, in his kitchen sink with help from Ayurvedic doctors - Vinod and Kusum Upadhyay. Today Aveda is part of Estée Lauder Companies Inc., based in New York. Rechelbacher sold Aveda to Estée Lauder Companies, Inc., in 1997 for $300 million, although Aveda continues to be run as a semi-autonomous entity. Upon selling the product to Estee Lauder Companies Inc., Horst also sold off the chain of salons to his successor, David Wagner. The salons formally known as Horst and Friends was renamed Juut Salonspa.
In 2004, Aveda was awarded the prestigious Corporate Achievement Award at the Smithsonian Cooper-Hewitt National Design Museum.
Aveda was one of the first beauty companies to endorse a set of principles designed to encourage greater environmental responsibility in business, known as The Ceres Principles (originally named The Valdez Principles).
According to the company's website, "Aveda" is Sanskrit for "all knowledge". "Aveda" written phonetically as "अवेद", translates to "non-vedic" (or म्लेच्छ).

Controversy
In 2009, Aveda (as a subsidiary of Estée Lauder Companies Inc.) was included by the BDS campaign as one of the "Top Ten Brands to Boycott This Christmas" because "This company’s chairman Ronald Lauder is also the chairman of the Jewish National Fund..."

In 2011 Aveda was slammed at Park City, Utah, during the Evolution of Women in Social Media conference, also known as evo'11, for announcing their no-payment policy for bloggers reviewing their products.

Aveda was also criticized for using the brand name "Indigenous", as a denigration of indigenous peoples. They have since renamed the product line.

Environment
Through a partnership with Native Energy, Aveda has helped fund wind turbines. Aveda claims that it purchases enough wind energy to power its primary manufacturing facility. The company "sends sustainability surveys to publications to help decide where to place its ads".

References

Further reading
 The New York Times, August 27, 2000 – Taking the Sweet Smell of Success To a New Level of Literalness

External links

 

Blaine, Minnesota
Cosmetics companies of the United States
Manufacturing companies based in Minnesota
Manufacturing companies established in 1978
1978 establishments in Minnesota
Estée Lauder Companies
Hair care products